Falling in Love is the third studio album of Filipino TV host, actress-singer Toni Gonzaga and her second on Star Records, released on June 18, 2007, in the Philippines in CD format and digital download. The carrier single released is "Catch Me, I'm Fallin'" accompanied with music video directed by Paul Soriano.

Background
Falling in Love contains 11 tracks of original OPM composition produced by Christian Martinez with two cover songs, "Kasalanan Ko Ba" originally done by Neo Colours and "I've Fallen for You" original by Jamie Rivera. It is Toni's second album under Star Records and was originally set to be released in May 2007 but was moved to June 18, 2007, due to an accident she had during filming of her "Enervon" TV ad. The album also includes her own composition "You're My Right Kind of Wrong". The album is awarded platinum certified by Philippine Association of the Record Industry (PARI).

Track listing

 track 2 “Kasalanan Ko Ba” is a remake of an original song by the Neocolours.
 track 3 “Perfect World” is the carrier track of Level Up Games' online game Perfect World.
 track 4 “I've Fallen for You” is a remake of an original song by Jamie Rivera and was featured in the Star Cinema film of the same name starring Gerald Anderson and Kim Chiu.
 track 11 "I'll Never Let You Go is a remake of an original song by JoAnne Lorenzana.

Personnel
Credits taken from Titik Pilipino
 Malou N. Santos – executive producer
 Annabelle R. Borja – executive producer
 Christian Martinez – producer
 Nixon Sy – marketing unit head
 Raffy P. Sunico – project assistant
 Monina B. Quejano – A&R coordination
 Beth Faustino – publishing coordinator
 Grace S. Torres – album concept & design
 Mer2 Ocate – additional design
 Andrew S. Castillo – art direction
 Xander Angeles – photography
 Edwin Tan – stylist
 Krist Bansuelo – hair & make-up

Certifications

References 

Star Music albums
2007 albums
Toni Gonzaga albums